Mark Jason McCammon (born 7 August 1978) is a former professional footballer who played as a striker. Born in England, he represented the Barbados national national team at international level.

After starting his career with Cambridge United in 1997, two years later he moved on to Charlton Athletic. In 2000, he was loaned out to Swindon Town, before signing with Brentford. He found regular football at Brentford, before departing for Millwall in 2003. Two years later he transferred to Brighton & Hove Albion, following a short loan period. Loaned out to Bristol City in 2006, he later moved on to Doncaster Rovers. He switched to Gillingham in 2008, where he remained for the next three years. He also played on loan for Bradford City in 2010. In October 2011, he signed for Braintree Town.

Club career

Early career
McCammon played six games for Cambridge United on a non-contract basis between August 1997 and March 1999. He played a minimal role in the club's promotion out of the Third Division in 1998–99.

He signed for Premier League Charlton Athletic in March 1999, and played five games for the Addicks following their relegation into the First Division. He was also loaned out to struggling Swindon Town in January 2000, also of the First Division, and played four games before his return to The Valley.

Brentford
McCammon signed for Second Division Brentford in July 2000 for a fee of almost £100,000. He scored six goals in 33 games during his first season with the club.

Limited to fourteen league appearances in 2001–02, he was a seventieth-minute substitute for Ben Burgess in the 2002 play-off final, though his team lost the game 2–0 to Stoke City.

He posted 41 appearances in 2002–03, also bagging nine goals. However, he did not finish the season at Brentford, as he joined First Division Millwall in March.

Millwall
He made only seven appearances in 2003–04. Instead his season was most notable for a clash with sixteen-year-old teammate Moses Ashikodi, who reportedly threatened McCammon with a plastic knife. The club launched an investigation into the events, and the following month, Ashikodi left the club by mutual consent. McCammon went on to make a substitute appearance in the 2004 FA Cup Final, coming on for Neil Harris after 75 minutes, as Millwall lost 3–0 to Manchester United.

Brighton & Hove Albion
Having been limited to just eight appearances for Millwall in 2004–05, and was loaned out to Championship rivals Brighton & Hove Albion in December 2004. He signed a permanent deal with the Seagulls in February 2005. However, he was soon struck down by illness.

Having recovered from an ankle injury (a piece of floating bone in his ankle), he found his first team opportunities limited in 2005–06, and so in January went on trial at Watford. The following month he joined League One Bristol City on loan, after Watford manager Aidy Boothroyd showed no interest in signing the striker. The loan deal was extended to the end of the season, despite the striker suffering from illness and a back injury. He was not offered a permanent deal with Bristol in the summer, and upon his return to Brighton he found the club relegated out of the Championship.

Doncaster Rovers
McCammon moved to Doncaster Rovers in August 2006 following a successful trial period, and was confident of a successful season. He picked up the honour of being the first player to score at the Keepmoat Stadium, the newly built home of Doncaster Rovers, after he scored after nine minutes into the 3–0 win over Huddersfield Town on 1 January 2007. He finished the season with five goals in thirty games, having missed the close of the campaign with a shoulder injury.

McCammon hit eight goals in forty games during the club's 2007–08 promotion campaign, though rejected a new deal with the club in the summer. He was a 71st-minute substitute for Richie Wellens in the 2008 play-off final at Wembley Stadium; Donny beat Leeds United 1–0 to achieve promotion into the Championship.

Gillingham
McCammon joined League Two Gillingham in July 2008 on a three-year contract, as manager Mark Stimson hoped McCammon would prove an adequate replacement for Delroy Facey. Recovering from a hamstring injury in pre-season, he posted five goals in 35 games in 2008–09, and was an unused substitute in the club's play-off final victory over Shrewsbury Town.

Finding first team chances limited in 2009–10, he joined Bradford City on a one-month loan in February 2010, despite having turned down a loan move to Rotherham United and still holding reservations over a move back into League Two. After returning to Gillingham from Valley Parade he turned down a loan move to Conference South side Dover Athletic. He finished the campaign with 25 appearances, four of which were for the Bantams.

Challenged to prove his worth in August by manager Andy Hessenthaler, he played just six games of the 2010–11 campaign, at was released after the expiry of his contract.

Later years
In summer 2011 he had trials at Crewe Alexandra and Port Vale.

In October, he signed for Braintree Town and opened his account for the club on his first start against Bath City. In March he signed for Lincoln City and again made an immediate impact with a goal on his debut as a late substitute again Mansfield Town and a goal on his first start for the club against Newport County.

In February 2012, McCammon began action against Gillingham at an employment tribunal alleging racial discrimination. McCammon claimed that Hessenthaler was "racially intolerant" and that the club had tried to "frustrate him out". The Tribunal found that he had indeed been a victim of racial discrimination.

International career
McCammon won five caps for Barbados, scoring four goals in the process. On 22 September 2006 he scored past Antigua and Barbuda in a 3–1 in the First Round of Qualifying for the 2007 Caribbean Cup. Two days later he scored a hat-trick past Anguilla in a 7–1 win – the nation's biggest ever victory. His nation went on to qualify for the tournament, before exiting at the First Round.

He returned to international football in 2008, so as to take part in his country's World Cup qualification campaign. On 15 June he played for his country in an 8–0 defeat to the United States at The Home Depot Center in Carson, California. Seven days later he played in the reverse fixture at Kensington Oval in Bridgetown, Barbados, which the Americans won 1–0.

Playing style
McCammon was a target man striker, able to win the ball in the air.

Career statistics

Club

International
Scores and results list Barbados' goal tally first, score column indicates score after each McCammon goal.

Honours
Cambridge United
Football League Third Division runner-up: 1998–99

Brentford
Football League Trophy runner-up: 2001

Millwall
FA Cup runner-up: 2003–04

Doncaster Rovers
Football League One play-off winner: 2008

References

External links

Living people
1978 births
Association football forwards
People with acquired Barbadian citizenship
Barbadian footballers
English footballers
English sportspeople of Barbadian descent
Footballers from Chipping Barnet
Barbados international footballers
English Football League players
Cambridge United F.C. players
Charlton Athletic F.C. players
Swindon Town F.C. players
Brentford F.C. players
Millwall F.C. players
Brighton & Hove Albion F.C. players
Bristol City F.C. players
Doncaster Rovers F.C. players
Gillingham F.C. players
Bradford City A.F.C. players
Sheffield F.C. players
Braintree Town F.C. players
Lincoln City F.C. players
FA Cup Final players